The Amalgamated Transit Union (ATU) is a labor organization in the United States and Canada that represents employees in the public transit industry. Established in 1892 as the Amalgamated Association of Street Railway Employees of America, the union was centered primarily in the Eastern United States; today, ATU has over 200,000 members throughout the United States and Canada.

History
The union was founded in 1892 as the Amalgamated Association of Street Railway Employees of America. The union has its origins in a meeting of the American Federation of Labor in 1891 at which president Samuel Gompers was asked to invite the local street railway associations to form an international union. Gompers sent a letter to the local street railway unions in April 1892, and based on the positive response arranged for a convention of street railway workers. The convention began on 12 September 1892 in Indianapolis, Indiana, attended by fifty delegates from twenty-two locals. Many of the smaller unions were affiliated with the AFL, while four larger locals were affiliated with the Knights of Labor and two were independent.

The first president was William J. Law from the AFL-affiliated local in Detroit. Detroit was chosen as the headquarters, using the same facilities as the Detroit local. Because the number of members affiliated with the Knights of Labor was greater than the numbers affiliated with the AFL, according to the claims of the delegates, the new international remained unaffiliated despite pleas by Gompers. The objectives included education, settlement of disputes with management, and securing good pay and working conditions. The international was given considerable authority over the locals.

The second convention was held in Cleveland in October 1893, with just fifteen divisions represented by about twenty delegates. At this meeting William D. Mahon was named president, and he still held this position in 1937. By then the union had been renamed the Amalgamated Association of Street, Electric Railway and Motor Coach Employees of America. The union struggled in the early years as the transit companies followed the practice of firing union activists. In the 1897 meeting in Dayton, Ohio, there were twenty delegates. The treasury of the union now had $4,008. An early achievement was to have laws passed in a dozen states by 1899 that mandated enclosed vestibules for the motormen. Wages were close to $2 a day where the union was established, and in Detroit and Worcester the nine-hour day had been achieved, although in most cities ten- or eleven-hour days were common.

At the start of the 20th century the Amalgamated Association launched a militant organizing program. Although the union was always willing to arbitrate in disputes, there were many strikes against the streetcar companies. Often these turned violent, as in St. Louis in 1900 or Denver in 1920. The public and small businesses sympathized with the strikers, and passengers and other unions often became involved in the street actions. When buses began to replace streetcars, the association began to be challenged by the International Brotherhood of Teamsters, Chauffeurs, Stablemen and Helpers. It was agreed that the Amalgamated Association would have jurisdiction over buses operated by street railway companies, while the Teamsters would have jurisdiction over independent bus lines and over road transportation of goods.

Political and legislative activities
In 2008, the ATU endorsed Hillary Clinton in her unsuccessful bid for the Democratic Presidential nomination; after she conceded defeat, the ATU endorsed Barack Obama in his bid to become president.

The ATU was named the "Most Valuable National Union" in The Nation magazine's Progressive Honor Roll of 2012 for its support of the Occupy movement, the National Day of Action for Public Transportation, and other social justice issues.

Timeline

Leadership

Presidents
1893: William D. Mahon
1946: Abraham Lincoln Spradling
1959: John M. Elliott
1973: Daniel V. Maroney
1981: John W. Rowland
1985: James La Sala
2003: Warren S. George
2010: Larry Hanley
2019: John A. Costa

Secretary-Treasurers
1892: J. C. Manual
1893: S. M. Massey
1894: M. G. Moore
1895: James G. Grant
1895: Rezin Orr
1917: L. D. Bland
1934: William Taber
1946: Rip Moscho
1968: James J. Hill
1974: John Rowland
1976: Raymond C. Wallace
1989: Oliver W. Green
2001: Oscar Owens
2019: Kenneth R. Kirk

References

Citations

Works cited

External links

 
 
 Amalgamated Transit Union Local 587 Records, 1941-2019. 34.51 cubic feet. At the Labor Archives of Washington, University of Washington Libraries Special Collections. 

AFL–CIO
Canadian Labour Congress
Road transport trade unions
Trade unions established in 1892
Transport trade unions in Canada
Transportation trade unions in the United States
1892 establishments in Canada
1892 establishments in Indiana